Ombatthane Dikku is a 2022 Indian Kannada-language  crime thriller film film directed and produced by Dayal Padmanabhan, starring Yogesh and Aditi Prabhudeva. The film is an official remake of the Tamil film Kurangu Bommai. It marks the second collaboration between director and Aditi Prabhudeva.

The film got positive reviews from both critics and audiences praise the movie for its unique narrative style and characterisation.

Cast

Production
After Ranganayaki, director Dayal Padmanabhan brought remake rights of Tamil film Kurangu Bommai.

The film is made on the genre of  action-thriller, starring Yogi and Aditi Prabhudeva, has a voiceover by Darshan. The film is produced by Dayal Padmanabhan's D Pictures in association with  K 9 Studio and G Cinemas.

Release
The film released on 28 January 2022 when the government gave permission to 50% occupation due to the coronavirus pandemic. 

The film released on Amazon Prime Video in last week of March 2022.

References

External links 
 

2022 films
2020s Kannada-language films
Films shot in Karnataka
Films postponed due to the COVID-19 pandemic
Indian action drama films
2022 crime thriller films
Indian crime thriller films
Kannada remakes of Tamil films
Films directed by Dayal Padmanabhan